In geometry, runcination is an operation that cuts a regular polytope (or honeycomb) simultaneously along the faces, edges, and vertices, creating new facets in place of the original face, edge, and vertex centers.

It is a higher order truncation operation, following cantellation, and truncation.

It is represented by an extended Schläfli symbol t0,3{p,q,...}. This operation only exists for 4-polytopes {p,q,r} or higher.

This operation is dual-symmetric for regular uniform 4-polytopes and 3-space convex uniform honeycombs.

For a regular {p,q,r} 4-polytope, the original {p,q} cells remain, but become separated. The gaps at the separated faces become p-gonal prisms. The gaps between the separated edges become r-gonal prisms. The gaps between the separated vertices become {r,q} cells. The vertex figure for a regular 4-polytope {p,q,r} is an q-gonal antiprism (called an antipodium if p and r are different).

For regular 4-polytopes/honeycombs, this operation is also called expansion by Alicia Boole Stott, as imagined by moving the cells of the regular form away from the center, and filling in new faces in the gaps for each opened vertex and edge.

Runcinated 4-polytopes/honeycombs forms:

See also 
 Uniform polyhedron
 Uniform 4-polytope
 Rectification (geometry)
 Truncation (geometry)
 Cantellation (geometry)

References 
 Coxeter, H.S.M. Regular Polytopes, (3rd edition, 1973), Dover edition,  (pp. 145–154 Chapter 8: Truncation, p 210 Expansion)
 Norman Johnson Uniform Polytopes, Manuscript (1991)
 N.W. Johnson: The Theory of Uniform Polytopes and Honeycombs, Ph.D. Dissertation, University of Toronto, 1966
 John H. Conway, Heidi Burgiel, Chaim Goodman-Strauss, The Symmetries of Things 2008,  (Chapter 26)

External links 
 

Polytopes